The 7th Politburo of the Communist Party of Vietnam (CPV), formally the 7th Political Bureau of the Central Committee of the Communist Party of Vietnam (Vietnamese: Bộ Chính trị Ban Chấp hành trung ương Đảng Cộng sản Việt Nam Khoá VII), was elected at the 1st Plenary Session of the 7th Central Committee in the immediate aftermath of the 7th National Congress.

Members

References

Bibliography
 Chân dung 19 ủy viên Bộ Chính trị khóa XII

7th Politburo of the Communist Party of Vietnam
1991 in Vietnam
1996 in Vietnam